A total of at least five special routes of U.S. Route 601 have existed, one of which has been deleted.

Special routes

Orangeburg truck route

U.S. Route 601 Truck (US 601 Truck) is a truck route to direct truck traffic to avoid downtown Oranbeburg. The highway travels concurrently with South Carolina Highway 4 (SC 4) on Stonewall Jackson Boulevard, then with US 21/US 178 on Joe S. Jeffords Highway/Whittaker Parkway/Chestnut Street.

Camden truck route

U.S. Route 601 Truck (US 601 Truck) is a  truck route for truck traffic to avoid downtown Camden. The highway is in complete concurrency with US 521 Truck on Springdale Drive and Boykin Road.

Kershaw business loop

U.S. Route 601 Business (US 601 Bus.) is a business route of US 601 that follows the original mainline of US 601 along Hampton Street. The highway is completely concurrent with US 521 Bus.

Dobson business loop

U.S. Route 601 Business, established in 1970, is a  business loop that follows the original mainline route through downtown Dobson, via Main Street.

Former special routes

Concord business loop

U.S. Route 601 Business was established in October 1965 and followed the original route through downtown Concord, via Church and Union Streets and in concurrency with NC 73.  In July 1997, the business loop was decommissioned

References

01-6
 
01-6
01-6